The Moldovan Orthodox Church is the Metropolis of Chișinău and All Moldova, established in 1944 in the Republic of Moldova.

The Moldovan Orthodox Church may refer to:
Metropolis of Moldavia and Bukovina (established in 1386), a metropolis of the Romanian Orthodox Church in Iași, Romania
Metropolis of Bessarabia (established in 1918), a self-governing church body in the Republic of Moldova, under the Romanian Orthodox Church

See also
Moldovan (disambiguation)
Moldavians (disambiguation)